Herbert Lewis Waters (born November 10, 1992) is an American football cornerback for the Carolina Cobras of the National Arena League (NAL). He most recently played for the Edmonton Elks of the Canadian Football League (CFL). He played college football as a wide receiver at the University of Miami. He was signed by the Green Bay Packers as an undrafted free agent in 2016. He has also played for the Pittsburgh Steelers.

Early years
Playing on both sides of the ball as well as returning punts at Homestead High School, Waters had five punt return touchdowns, ten receiving touchdowns and two interceptions as a senior. He was a three-star recruit. He is also from homestead fl.

College career
At the University of Miami, Waters started two games as a true freshman. That season, he had 10 catches for 227 yards and two touchdowns. After catching five touchdowns his sophomore year, Waters' reps took a bit of a downturn his junior year, but he bounced back during his senior year with career highs in catches (41) and yards (624). Waters was recorded as having a 4.50-second 40-yard dash and a 38.5-inch vertical jump.

College statistics

Professional career

Green Bay Packers
Waters was signed by the Green Bay Packers on May 2, 2016, as an undrafted free agent. He was released during final cuts on September 3, 2016 and was signed to the practice squad. Packers defensive backs coach Joe Whitt Jr. persuaded Waters to switch from wide receiver to cornerback as a result of three injuries at that position in the first two weeks of the season. He was promoted to the active roster on January 5, 2017.

On August 3, 2017, Waters suffered a shoulder injury and was ruled out for the season.

Waters re-signed with the Packers on March 15, 2018. However, he was waived by the team on September 3.

Pittsburgh Steelers
On October 2, 2018, Waters was signed to the Pittsburgh Steelers' practice squad. He signed a reserve/future contract with the Steelers on January 1, 2019.

On August 1, 2019, Waters was waived/injured by the Steelers and placed on injured reserve. He was released on August 27.

Tampa Bay Vipers
Waters was drafted in the 8th round during phase four in the 2020 XFL Draft by the Tampa Bay Vipers. He was waived on February 1, 2020, and re-signed on February 11, 2020. He had his contract terminated when the league suspended operations on April 10, 2020.

Hamilton Tiger-Cats
Waters signed with the Hamilton Tiger-Cats of the Canadian Football League (CFL )on December 28, 2020. He was released on June 28, 2021.

Carolina Cobras 
In 2021, Waters signed with the Carolina Cobras of the National Arena League (NAL).

Edmonton Elks 
On October 20, 2021, Waters signed with the Edmonton Elks. He played one game with the team.

Montreal Alouettes 
On February 27, 2022, Waters signed with the Montreal Alouettes. He was released on July 17, 2022.

Carolina Cobras (second stint) 
On June 8, 2022, Waters resigned with the Cobras.

References

External links
Green Bay Packers bio
Miami Hurricanes bio

1992 births
Living people
American football cornerbacks
American football wide receivers
Green Bay Packers players
Hamilton Tiger-Cats players
Miami Hurricanes football players
People from Homestead, Florida
Pittsburgh Steelers players
Players of American football from Florida
Sportspeople from Miami-Dade County, Florida
Tampa Bay Vipers players